Hermann Fellner  (20 December 1950 – 17 May 2020) was a German politician, representative of the Christian Social Union of Bavaria. He was a member of the Bundestag of Germany.

Fellner was in its youth chairman of the local federation of the Young Union Ehenfeld - Massenricht. During his studies he was active in the Ring Christlich-Demokratischer Studenten. In 1980, Fellner moved into the German Bundestag as the youngest member of parliament at the time as a direct representative of the Amberg constituency. He was a member of the German Bundestag until 1990. During this time, he held the office of domestic policy spokesman for the CSU state-group (Landesgruppe), among other things.

When asked in 1985, in connection with the sale of the Flick Group to Deutsche Bank, whether compensation should be paid to forced laborers during the Nazi era, Fellner said that he saw 

Later, Fellner recommended that Deutsche Bank pay compensation even without a legal obligation, and explained his statements, which had been criticized as anti-Semitic and for which he apologized to the Bundestag on 16 January 1986, after initial rejection, to the effect that he did not question compensation from a moral standpoint, but there was no legal basis for it.

See also
List of Bavarian Christian Social Union politicians

References

1950 births
2020 deaths
Members of the Bundestag for Bavaria
Members of the Bundestag 1987–1990
Members of the Bundestag 1983–1987
Members of the Bundestag 1980–1983
Members of the Bundestag for the Christian Social Union in Bavaria